Su Lin (or Su-Lin) may refer to:

Su-Lin Young (1911–2008), Chinese American explorer of the Himalayas 
Either of two giant pandas named after the explorer: 
Su Lin (1930s giant panda), first live giant panda brought to the United States
Su Lin (giant panda, born 2005), giant panda born at the San Diego Zoo